Röllbach is a municipality in the Miltenberg district in the Regierungsbezirk of Lower Franconia (Unterfranken) in Bavaria, Germany and a member of the Verwaltungsgemeinschaft (Administrative Community) of Mönchberg.

Geography

Location 
The municipality lies in the Spessart (range), in the Mainviereck (“Main Square”) between Klingenberg, Mönchberg and Großheubach.

Politics 
Until 1984, all members of Röllbach municipal council came exclusively from the CSU. Since the 1984 municipal election, the CWR (Christliche Wählergemeinschaft Röllbach, or Christian Voters’ Community) has also been represented on municipal council. At the 2003 Landtag elections, the CSU garnered 74.15% of the second votes.

Municipal council 

The council is made up of 13 council members, counting the part-time mayor, with seats apportioned thus:

(as at municipal election held on 2 March 2008)

Mayor 
Röllbach’s mayor is Michael Schwing (CSU). He was first elected in 2020.

Coat of arms 
The municipality’s arms might be described thus: Gules a pallet argent, dexter a wheel spoked of six of the same, sinister five billets Or, two, one and two.

The arms are based on the Schultheiß’s (roughly, “sheriff’s”) seal from the 18th century. The Wheel of Mainz refers to Electoral Mainz’s former hegemony in the region, while the pallet (narrow vertical stripe), and the billets on the sinister (armsbearer’s left, viewer’s right) side are drawn from the arms formerly borne by the Barons of Hoheneck, who are known to have been in Röllbach in 1718, and who died out in 1808.

The arms have been borne since 1970.

References 

Miltenberg (district)